Otis Jan Mohammed Khan (born 5 September 1995) is an English professional footballer who plays as an attacking midfielder for Grimsby Town.

Khan came through the youth academy at Manchester United before going on to turn professional for Sheffield United. He has also played professionally for Barnsley, Yeovil Town, Mansfield Town, Newport County, Tranmere Rovers, Walsall and Leyton Orient. He has also spent brief loan spells at non-league sides Buxton, Matlock Town and Barrow. Born in England he was called up to the Pakistan team in 2015 but did not play in a game and is yet to be capped.

Club career
Khan started his career at Manchester United's youth system before joining Sheffield United's Academy in the summer of 2012. Khan made his first team début in March 2014 in an away game at Crawley Town. While at Sheffield United, Khan played on loan at Buxton before joining Matlock Town on loan on 16 January 2015.

Khan was released from his contract by Sheffield United on 25 January 2016. That same day, League One side Barnsley announced that Khan had signed an 18-month deal with the club after a successful trial.

On 30 June 2016, Khan joined Football League Two side Yeovil Town on a one-year deal. Khan scored on his debut for Yeovil in a 2–0 opening day victory against Notts County.

On 29 June 2018, Khan signed for fellow League Two side Mansfield Town for an undisclosed fee.

On January deadline day 2020, Khan joined fellow League Two side Newport County on a sixth-month loan deal. He made his debut for Newport as a second half substitute in the 1-0 defeat against Cambridge United on 8 February 2020. He was released by Mansfield at the end of the 2019–20 season.

On 10 August 2020, following his release from Mansfield, Khan joined League Two club Tranmere Rovers on a one-year deal, turning down offers from League One clubs.

On 18 October 2021, Khan joined League Two side Walsall on a short-term deal. On 19 January 2022, Khan left the club following the expiration of his short-term deal. Later that same day, Khan signed an 18-month contract with EFL League Two side Leyton Orient.

On 1 July 2022, Khan joined newly promoted League Two club Grimsby Town on a two-year deal.

International career
Khan is eligible to play for Pakistan as it is the birthplace of his grandfather. In January 2015, Khan was called up to play for the Pakistan national football team in a friendly against Afghanistan but he missed the match as he did not get the necessary visas and vaccinations; he was however confirmed selected for the 2018 FIFA World Cup qualifying matches in March 2015.

Khan then declined to consider any call-ups to the Pakistan national side in the hope of playing for England in the future. However by 2022, due to continued appearances in the lower leagues restricting any England prospects, Khan had a change of heart and rekindled his interest to represent Pakistan internationally.

Personal life
In 2016, Khan appeared on the second series of the ITV assault course game show Ninja Warrior UK, completing the course in a time of 2:41.

Career statistics

Honours
Tranmere Rovers
EFL Trophy runner-up: 2020–21

References

External links

1995 births
Living people
Footballers from Ashton-under-Lyne
English footballers
Association football midfielders
Manchester United F.C. players
Sheffield United F.C. players
Buxton F.C. players
Matlock Town F.C. players
Barrow A.F.C. players
Barnsley F.C. players
Yeovil Town F.C. players
Mansfield Town F.C. players
Newport County A.F.C. players
Tranmere Rovers F.C. players
Walsall F.C. players
Leyton Orient F.C. players
Grimsby Town F.C. players
English Football League players
British Asian footballers
English people of Pakistani descent
British sportspeople of Pakistani descent
Ninja Warrior UK contestants